In enzymology, a L-galactonolactone oxidase is an enzyme that catalyzes the chemical reaction

L-galactono-1,4-lactone + O2  L-ascorbate + H2O2

Thus, the two substrates of this enzyme are L-galactono-1,4-lactone and O2, whereas its two products are L-ascorbic acid and H2O2.

This enzyme belongs to the family of oxidoreductases, specifically those acting on the CH-CH group of donor with oxygen as acceptor.  The systematic name of this enzyme class is L-galactono-1,4-lactone:oxygen 3-oxidoreductase. This enzyme is also called L-galactono-1,4-lactone oxidase.  This enzyme participates in ascorbic acid and aldaric acid metabolism.  It employs one cofactor, FAD.

References

 

EC 1.3.3
Flavoproteins
Enzymes of unknown structure